The Telecommunications Act 1984 (c 12) is an Act of the Parliament of the United Kingdom. The rules for the industry are now contained in the Communications Act 2003.

Provisions 
The provisions of the act included the following:
 Privatising British Telecom.
 Establishing Oftel as a telecommunications regulator to protect consumers' interests and market competition.
 Introducing a licensing system for running a telecommunications system or making a connection to another system without a licence. Doing so without a licence became a criminal offence.
 Setting standards for modems according to BABT rules.
 Criminalising indecent, offensive or threatening phone calls.

Section 94

Section 94 of the act provided a very broad power of government regulation of telecommunications in the interests of national security or relations with foreign governments. It allowed any Secretary of State to give secret directions to Ofcom or any providers of public electronic communications networks. They could be instructed “to do, or not to do” any particular thing specified, and the directions did not automatically expire after a certain period. The Secretary of State was required to lay a copy of every such direction before parliament so as to alert parliament to any possible misuse. However, this did not need to be done if to do so would be against the interests of national security or relations with foreign governments.

It is not known to what extent this power has been used. In reply to a parliamentary question, the security minister James Brokenshire replied: “If the question relates to section 94 of the Telecommunications Act, then I am afraid I can neither confirm nor deny any issues in relation to the utilisation or otherwise of section 94.” The Interception of Communications Commissioner was asked in 2015 by prime minister David Cameron to oversee section 94 directions, but was unable to do so because "there does not appear to be a comprehensive central record of the directions that have been issued by the various Secretaries of State." The commissioner recommended that oversight of section 94 directions is put on a statutory footing and that future legislation requires the use of the section 94 directions to be reported to the commissioner.

Subsequently, on 4 November 2015, the Home Secretary announced that after the September 11 attacks in the U.S., MI5 started collecting bulk telephone communications data on which telephone numbers called each other and when, under a section 94 direction instead of the Regulation of Investigatory Powers Act 2000 which would have brought independent oversight and regulation. This had been kept secret until announced in 2015, without laying the direction before parliament under the against the interests of national security exemption.

Section 94 was later repealed by the Investigatory Powers Act 2016 which introduced new powers for the interception and collection, including bulk collection, of communications by British Intelligence Agencies, authorized by the Investigatory Powers Commission (IPC) it introduces.

References

See also
UK public service law
 Telecommunications Act (Canada)
 Telecommunications Act of 1996, United States
Halsbury's Statutes
Current Law Statutes Annotated

History of telecommunications in the United Kingdom
Information technology organisations based in the United Kingdom
United Kingdom Acts of Parliament 1984
Public services
United Kingdom public law